King of Spain Prize in Economics is an award recognizing  the scientific career of Spanish or Latin American personalities in the field of the economics. It was created in 1986 by the Foundation José Celma Prieto and it is awarded every two years. The president of the jury is the Governor of the Bank of Spain.

It is the most highly recognized prize for economics  research in Spain and Latin America.

Awarded 
These are the recipients of the prize:

References

External links 
 Premis REI JOAN CARLES d'Economia a economistas.org
 News about the Prize at El País

Spanish awards